Williams is a town in Colleton County, South Carolina, United States. The population was 117 at the 2010 census.

History
The Tom Williams House was listed in the National Register of Historic Places in 1973.

Geography
Williams is located in northern Colleton County at  (33.034076, -80.842928).

Demographics

As of the census of 2000, there were 116 people, 48 households, and 33 families residing in the town. The population density was 147.5 people per square mile (56.7/km2). There were 59 housing units at an average density of 75.0 per square mile (28.8/km2). The racial makeup of the town was 53.45% White, 44.83% African American, 0.86% from other races, and 0.86% from two or more races. Hispanic or Latino of any race were 0.86% of the population.

There were 48 households, out of which 20.8% had children under the age of 18 living with them, 60.4% were married couples living together, 10.4% had a female householder with no husband present, and 29.2% were non-families. 25.0% of all households were made up of individuals, and 18.8% had someone living alone who was 65 years of age or older. The average household size was 2.42 and the average family size was 2.91.

In the town, the population was spread out, with 22.4% under the age of 18, 5.2% from 18 to 24, 19.8% from 25 to 44, 32.8% from 45 to 64, and 19.8% who were 65 years of age or older. The median age was 48 years. For every 100 females, there were 93.3 males. For every 100 females age 18 and over, there were 87.5 males.

The median income for a household in the town was $31,563, and the median income for a family was $33,333. Males had a median income of $24,821 versus $25,625 for females. The per capita income for the town was $17,691. There were 2.6% of families and 6.5% of the population living below the poverty line, including 6.1% of under eighteens and 4.3% of those over 64.

References

Towns in Colleton County, South Carolina
Towns in South Carolina